Lubomira Bacheva and Cristina Torrens Valero were the defending champions but lost in the first round to Laurence Courtois and Elena Tatarkova.

Tathiana Garbin and Janette Husárová won in the final 6–1, 6–3 against Zsófia Gubacsi and Dragana Zarić.

Seeds
Champion seeds are indicated in bold text while text in italics indicates the round in which those seeds were eliminated.

 Alexandra Fusai /  Rita Grande (quarterfinals)
 Tathiana Garbin /  Janette Husárová (champions)
 Kristie Boogert /  Miriam Oremans (quarterfinals)
 Karina Habšudová /  Magdalena Maleeva (first round)

Draw

External links
 2001 Colortex Budapest Grand Prix Doubles draw

Budapest Grand Prix
2001 WTA Tour